Sajjad Hussain (born 1 September 1986) is a Pakistani first-class cricketer who plays for Hyderabad.

References

External links
 

1986 births
Living people
Pakistani cricketers
Federally Administered Tribal Areas cricketers
Hyderabad (Pakistan) cricketers
Cricketers from Multan